The 2012 Allsvenskan, part of the 2012 Swedish football season, was the 88th season of Allsvenskan since its establishment in 1924. The 2012 fixtures were released on 12 December 2011. The season started on 31 March 2012 and ended on 4 November 2012. There was a five-week-long break between 24 May and 30 June during the UEFA Euro 2012. Helsingborgs IF were the defending champions, having won their fifth Swedish championship and their seventh Allsvenskan title the previous season.

IF Elfsborg won the Swedish championship this season, their sixth one, in the 30th and last round on 4 November 2012 by drawing with Åtvidabergs FF 1–1 at home, and by the only other title contender in the last round Malmö FF losing 2–0 against AIK at the last Allsvenskan match at Råsunda. This was Elfsborg's second Swedish championship of the 21st century having won their last title in the 2006 Allsvenskan season.

A total of 16 teams contested the league; 14 returned from the 2011 season and two had been promoted from Superettan.

Summary

Background
The annual pre-season kick-off meeting was held in Helsingborg on 27 March 2012. All managers accompanied with a key player for their team were interviewed by the two hosts Tommy Åström and Jens Fjellström about the upcoming season and their expectations as well as what team they held as favourites to win the title. Only Kalmar FF's manager Nanne Bergstrand and Malmö FF's Rikard Norling held their own team as the title favourite. 5 managers out of 16 believed that Malmö FF would win the title. The remaining managers placed their bets on IF Elfsborg (4 votes), IFK Göteborg (3 votes), Helsingborgs IF (2 votes) and Kalmar FF (2 votes). The entire attendance consisted of the clubs' managers, key players and media experts. The attendance voted Malmö FF as the title favourites with Helsingborgs IF and IFK Göteborg closely after. The attendance also predicted that GIF Sundsvall and Syrianska FC would be relegated while Åtvidabergs FF would have to play the relegation play-offs to remain in the league.

Season overview
The season started on 31 March 2012 with three fixtures. Several of the favourite teams got off to a struggling start, reigning champions Helsingborg found themselves in a mid-table position after the first four rounds of fixtures. Malmö and Kalmar also positioned themselves mid-table at the same time and IFK Göteborg failed to win any of their first four matches, finding themselves in 15th position. Elfsborg however won all of their matches in the beginning of the season except for the away fixture against Helsingborg which they lost 2–1. Åtvidaberg lead the league surprisingly after three consecutive wins and one loss in the start of the season.

Following the fourth round Elfsborg passed Åtvidaberg to become the new leaders of the league. The team managed to win all of the remaining matches until the Euro break except for the away fixture against Malmö which they lost 1–0, Elfsborg won seven consecutive matches during this run. Malmö eventually recovered from a poor start of the season to trail Elfsborg eight points below at the time of the Euro break. AIK and Häcken also managed to win enough points to keep up with the top, trailing Malmö with one and two points respectively at the same time. Reigning champions Helsingborg found themselves in fifth place in time for the summer break, trailing fourth placed Häcken with two points and leaders Elfsborg with 12 points. Early leaders Åtvidaberg had by this time dropped down to sixth place and were now trailing Helsingborg. One of the early favourite to win the title, IFK Göteborg, were by this period of time positioned 10th in the league table. trailing Elfsborg with as much as 15 points. Another favourite, Kalmar, were positioned in 13th place. Örebro were found at the bottom of the league table at the time of the Euro break having failed to win any of the 12 fixtures being played at that time and only having been able to draw four of the matches, they were now trailing 15th placed GAIS with five points and 13th placed Kalmar with nine points.

Later on in the season, four teams had emerged as the favourites to win the title. With five rounds remaining Elfsborg had 49 points, Häcken and AIK both had 47 points and Malmö had 46 points. At the other end of the Allsvenskan table, it appeared as if both Örebro and GAIS were headed towards Superettan, trailing the 14th team in the league by 11 and 14 points, respectively. GAIS were confirmed as relegated after the completion of the 26th round and Örebro followed after the 27th round. Elfsborg held pole position until the 23rd round when they were passed by Häcken, Elfsborg had held the first position since the 5th round up until then.

Elfsborg would get ten out of 15 possible points in their last five games - winning against GAIS, losing against Norrköping, then winning against Gefle and Mjällby before finishing with 1–1 against Åtvidaberg - which would prove to be enough for them to win their sixth title.

Teams 
A total of sixteen teams contested the league, including fourteen sides from the 2011 season and two promoted teams from the 2011 Superettan.

Trelleborgs FF and Halmstads BK were relegated at the end of the 2011 season after finishing in the bottom two places of the table. They were replaced by 2011 Superettan champions Åtvidabergs FF and runners-up GIF Sundsvall.

Syrianska FC as 14th-placed team retained their Allsvenskan spot after defeating third-placed Superettan team Ängelholms FF 4–3 on aggregate in a relegation/promotion playoff.

Stadia and locations

 1 According to each club information page at the Swedish Football Association website for Allsvenskan.

Personnel and kits

Note: Flags indicate national team as has been defined under FIFA eligibility rules. Players and Managers may hold more than one non-FIFA nationality.

 1 According to each club information page at the Swedish Football Association website for Allsvenskan.
 3 Syrianska FC's Özcan Melkemichel had the title Manager while Klebér Saarenpää had the title Head coach, the team selection was done by Melkemichel.

Managerial changes

League table

Positions by round

Note: Some matches were played out of phase with the corresponding round, positions were corrected in hindsight.

Results

Play-offs

Season statistics

Top scorers

Top assists

Hat-tricks

 5 Player scored 5 goals

Scoring
First goal of the season: Anders Svensson for IF Elfsborg against Djurgårdens IF (31 March 2012)
Fastest goal of the season: 8 seconds, Daniel Sobralense for IFK Göteborg against Mjällby AIF (12 August 2012)
Latest goal of the season: 94 minutes and 3 seconds, Walid Atta for Helsingborgs IF against Syrianska FC (14 July 2012)
Largest winning margin: 6 goals – BK Häcken 6–0 IFK Norrköping (16 May 2012)
Highest scoring game: 9 goals
Helsingborgs IF 7–2 Kalmar FF (12 August 2012)
IFK Norrköping 7–2 GAIS (1 October 2012)
Most goals scored in a match by a single team: 7 goals
Helsingborgs IF 7–2 Kalmar FF (12 August 2012)
IFK Norrköping 7–2 GAIS (1 October 2012)
Most goals scored in a match by a losing team: 3 goals
Örebro SK 3–4 Åtvidabergs FF (2 April 2012)
Mjällby AIF  4–3 Djurgårdens IF (20 April 2012)
Fewest games failed to score in: 3
BK Häcken
Most games failed to score in: 13
GAIS
Gefle IF
GIF Sundsvall

Clean sheets
Most clean sheets: 13
IF Elfsborg
Malmö FF
Fewest clean sheets: 4
GIF Sundsvall
Åtvidabergs FF

Discipline
Worst overall disciplinary record (1 pt per yellow card, 3 pts per red card): 70 – Syrianska FC (49 yellow cards, 7 red cards)
Best overall disciplinary record: 31 – Gefle IF (31 yellow cards) 
Most yellow cards (club): 61 – Örebro SK 
Most yellow cards (player): 9
Tobias Grahn (Örebro SK)
Ari Skúlason (GIF Sundsvall)
Most red cards (club):  7 – Syrianska FC 
Most red cards (player): 2
Omar Jawo (Syrianska FC)
Richard Ekunde (GAIS)
Dwayne Miller (Syrianska FC)
Haris Skenderović (Syrianska FC)
 Emin Nouri (Kalmar FF)
 Tom Söderberg (BK Häcken)
Most fouls (player): 54 – Andreas Johansson (IFK Norrköping)

Attendance

See also 

Competitions
 2012 Supercupen
 2012 Superettan
 2012 Division 1

Team seasons
 2012 Djurgårdens IF season
 2012 BK Häcken season
 2012 Malmö FF season
 2012 Åtvidabergs FF season

Transfers
 List of Swedish football transfers winter 2011–2012
 List of Swedish football transfers summer 2012

References

External links 

  

Allsvenskan seasons
Swed
Swed
1